The Iminog is a left tributary of the river Olt in Romania. It discharges into the Olt in Mărunței.

References

Rivers of Romania
Rivers of Olt County